The Yosemite Transportation Company Office, also known as the Wells Fargo Office, was built in the Yosemite Valley in 1910 to house facilities of motor stage and horse stage services between the nearest rail terminal at El Portal and Yosemite National Park. The rustic log structure also provided telegraph and express services.

Description
The building is an example of the Rustic architecture as it was applied at Yosemite, with strips of cedar bark applied in a decorative pattern.

History
After 1927 the importance of stage services declined with the completion of a paved automobile road into the valley, and the YTC Office became a clearinghouse for accommodations in the Yosemite Valley. In the late 1930s the building was converted to a residence.

The National Park Service management plan for the Yosemite Valley planned for the removal of buildings considered intrusive in the Old Yosemite Village area. The YTC building was designated for demolition during the Mission 66 program, but was instead moved to the Pioneer Yosemite History Center at Wawona in Yosemite National Park for preservation, part of an ensemble of other buildings moved from elsewhere in Yosemite.

The Yosemote Transportation Company Office was placed on the National Register of Historic Places on June 9, 1978.

See also
History of the Yosemite area
National Register of Historic Places listings in Mariposa County, California

References

External links

Commercial buildings on the National Register of Historic Places in California
Transport infrastructure completed in 1910
Rustic architecture in California
Transportation buildings and structures on the National Register of Historic Places in California
National Register of Historic Places in Mariposa County, California
National Register of Historic Places in Yosemite National Park
1910 establishments in California
Relocated buildings and structures in California